Patrick Boileau (born February 22, 1975) is a Canadian former ice hockey defenceman. He played 48 games in the National Hockey League with the Washington Capitals, Detroit Red Wings, and Pittsburgh Penguins between 1997 and 2004. The rest of his career, which lasted from 1995 to 2008, was spent in various minor leagues and in Europe.

Boileau was born in Montreal, Quebec and raised in Blainville, Quebec. Selected by the Washington Capitals in the 1993 NHL Entry Draft, he spent years in the Capitals system mainly with their AHL affiliate Portland Pirates until he signed with the Detroit Red Wings in 2002. In 2003, he signed with the Pittsburgh Penguins. In 2004, he played in Switzerland for Lausanne and in 2005 he moved to Germany to play for the Frankfurt Lions of the Deutsche Eishockey Liga and also played for the Hamburg Freezers. In 2007–2008 he played with the Summum Chiefs de Saint-Jean-sur-Richelieu in the LNAH.

Career statistics

Regular season and playoffs

External links
 

1975 births
Living people
Canadian expatriate ice hockey players in Germany
Canadian ice hockey defencemen
Detroit Red Wings players
Frankfurt Lions players
Hamburg Freezers players
Grand Rapids Griffins players
Ice hockey people from Montreal
Indianapolis Ice players
Lausanne HC players
Laval Titan Collège Français players
Laval Titan players
People from Blainville, Quebec
Pittsburgh Penguins players
Portland Pirates players
Washington Capitals draft picks
Washington Capitals players
Wilkes-Barre/Scranton Penguins players